Sultan Aji Muhammad Sulaiman Sepinggan International Airport (IATA: BPN, ICAO: WALL), also known as Sepinggan Airport, is an international airport serving the city of Balikpapan and adjacent areas of East Kalimantan, located in Kalimantan, Indonesia. The airport began its new operational phase on 6 August 1997, with a new building and runway structure, replacing the old structure on the same site. The airport is operated by PT.

In May 2021, Sultan Aji Muhammad Sulaiman Airport's decline in air traffic was among the worst of all airports in East Kalimantan. Since 2020, Sultan Aji Muhammad Sulaiman Airport does not operate international flights.

The airport is the third busiest airport in Kalimantan after that in Banjarmasin and Pontianak. The airport was named the second-best in service in the world for airports with annual handling capacity of 5 million to 15 million passengers in 2018 by Airports Council International.

History

The construction of Sultan Aji Muhammad Sulaiman Sepinggan International Airport started in the Dutch colonial era before Indonesian independence. It was used mainly for the Dutch Oil Company's activities in the Balikpapan area. The airport soon became public and commercial after its management was handed over to Direktorat Jenderal Perhubungan Udara of Republic Indonesia in 1960. Sultan Aji Muhammad Sulaiman Sepinggan International Airport was finally managed by Perum Angkasa Pura I (PT Angkasa Pura I on present day) due to Government Regulation (PP) No.1 on 9 January 1987. With numerous buildings located around the airport and its only runway jutting out into the settlement, landings at the airport were dramatic to experience and technically demanding for pilots.

Sultan Aji Muhammad Sulaiman Sepinggan International Airport had been renovated twice from 1991 to 1997. The first phase was started in 1991 and ended in 1994, to renovate the taxiway, passenger and cargo terminals and lengthen the runway. In 1995, the Indonesian government announced Sultan Aji Muhammad Sulaiman Airport as the fifth Indonesian hajj embarkation airport for Kalimantan region which also consists West Kalimantan, Central Kalimantan and South Kalimantan province. The second phase renovation took place in 1996 to renovate the hangars, fuel depots and the administration buildings. The second phase was finished and the airport started its new operational era with the new buildings and facilities in 1997.

The notable timeline of the airport:

 Pre-Independence: Used by the Dutch oil company, Bataafse Petroleum Maatschappij (BPM)
 1960: Airport operation handed to the Bureau of Civil Aviation, hereinafter referred to as the Directorate General of Civil Aviation
 January 1987: Airport management transferred to Perum Angkasa Pura I
 1991: Development project for airport facilities and aviation safety initiated (Phase 1)
 August 1993: Test operations begin
 September 1993: Airport officially opened
 1995: Officially designated as the 5th Hajj Embarkation airport
 1996–1997: Development project for airport facilities and aviation safety initiated (Phase 2)
 August 1997: Officially launched by the 2nd President of Indonesia, Suharto
 July 2011: New passenger terminal construction initiated
 2012: Cargo terminal move to new building initiated.
 2012: Office of Administration, Finance & Commercial move to new offices in the two-story building that has been built as a support facility for the Development Project of Sultan Aji Muhammad Sulaiman Sepinggan International Airport.
 March 2014: New terminal building tested
September 2014: New terminal building officially opened by the 6th President of Indonesia, Susilo Bambang Yudhoyono

New terminal
The new terminal was tested on 22 March 2014 with a capacity 10 million passengers per year. It is the biggest airport in East Indonesia which overcame the overcapacity of 7.1 million passengers last year in only 1.7 million capacity of the old terminal. The Sultan Aji Muhammad Sulaiman Sepinggan International Airport Eco-Airport is equipped with a water recycling plant, air condition control of energy efficiency, 11 trunk alleys, 74 check-in counters, 8 conveyor belts,  apron, and 2,300 parking lots in a multi-story building. The new terminal formally opened on 15 September 2014.

Airlines and destinations

Passenger

Cargo

Accidents and incidents
On 4 July 1988, Vickers Viscount PK-IVW of Bouraq Indonesia Airlines was damaged beyond economic repair when the starboard and nose gear collapsed during a tailwind landing.

Gallery

References

External links

Persero Angkasa Pura I official site

Balikpapan
Buildings and structures in Balikpapan